Ayman Awwad Mahmoud Abu Fares (born January 29, 1988) is a retired Jordanian footballer of Palestinian origin, a striker.

References

External links 
 

1988 births
Living people
Jordanian footballers
Jordan international footballers
Jordanian Pro League players
Association football forwards
Jordanian people of Palestinian descent
Sportspeople from Amman
Shabab Al-Hussein SC players
Shabab Al-Ordon Club players
Al-Yarmouk FC (Jordan) players
Al-Jazeera (Jordan) players
Al-Sareeh SC players
Shabab Al-Aqaba Club players
Al-Baqa'a Club players